Cuando la Sangre Galopa is an album recorded by Mexican rock band Jaguares. The LP was released on July 10, 2001 under the label BMG US Latin. It was nominated for Rock Album of the Year at the 2002 Lo Nuestro Awards.

Track listing

Personnel
 Saul Hernández (lead voice, guitar, bass guitar)
 Alfonso André (drums)
 Cesar “El Vampiro” López García (main guitar)
 Howard Willing (engineer)
 Peter DiRado (assistant engineer)
 David Campbell (arranger, orchestrator and conductor)

Guest musicians
Stuart Hamm, Chucho Merchán, Rubén Maldonado, Luis Conte, Alberto Salas, Patrick Warren, Greg Walls.

Sales and certifications

References 

2001 albums
Jaguares (band) albums